Kévin Sommer (born 11 August 1989) is a French professional footballer who plays as a goalkeeper for Luxembourg side Jeunesse Esch.

External links
 

1989 births
Living people
French people of German descent
Footballers from Mulhouse
French footballers
Association football goalkeepers
Ligue 2 players
Championnat National 2 players
Championnat National 3 players
Luxembourg National Division players
RC Strasbourg Alsace players
FC Mulhouse players
FC RM Hamm Benfica players
ASC Biesheim players
Jeunesse Esch players
FC Progrès Niederkorn players
French expatriate footballers
French expatriate sportspeople in Luxembourg
Expatriate footballers in Luxembourg
French expatriate sportspeople in Belgium
Expatriate footballers in Belgium